Loch Sionascaig is a large irregular shaped, freshwater loch in the remote Coigach area of northern Wester Ross. It is located 5.5 miles southeast of the village of Lochinver and is situated within the Inverpolly Forest.

Geography
Loch Sionascaig is an area of outstanding natural beauty, that lies at the centre of the Inverpolly National Nature Reserve. It is surrounded by many other lochs with the large forested areas of Inverpolly Forest and Loch Lurgainn to the south. Also directly south is Loch an Doire Dhuibh which is connected by a narrow channel to Loch Sionascaig. To the southeast is the imposing peak of Cùl Beag and Drumrunie Forest. To the east is the large Loch Veyatie, to the northeast is the mountain of Stac Pollaidh and Canisp behind it. To the north west is Loch Ùidh Tarraigean and Loch na Dàil that Loch Sionasgaig drains through, reaching the River Polly that drains into Polly Bay. To the west are the large lochs of Loch Bad A' Ghaill and Loch Osgaig.

Loch Sionascaig has numerous islands that are wooded. Eilean Mòr is the biggest and has a small hill that rises to 116m giving excellent views of the surrounding loch.

Fishing
Loch Sionascaig is a renowned fishing loch with trout of around 6oz in size caught in the shallows up to more than 16lbs in the deeps.

Academic study
Loch Sionascaig is one of the intestively academically studied lateglacial and Holocene sites in Scotland. Types of analysis that have been undertaken at the site include pollen analysis, diatom analysis, sediment geochemistry, peat stratigraphy and radiocarbon dating.

Notes

References

Freshwater lochs of Scotland
Polly Basin
Lochs of Ross and Cromarty